Derek Russell Dorris (born December 1, 1978) is an American former football wide receiver who played in the National Football League for the New York Giants for six games in 2002.

References

1978 births
Living people
New York Giants players
Players of American football from Texas
American football wide receivers
Texas Tech Red Raiders football players